Razgardan (also Romanized as Rāzgardān, Rāz Gardān, Rāzgardan, and Razgordān; also known as Rāstgerdān, Rast Gordan, and Rāstgordān) is a village in Khondab Rural District, in the Central District of Khondab County, Markazi Province, Iran. At the 2006 census, its population was 440, in 99 families.

References 

Populated places in Khondab County